Czekarzewice may refer to the following places in Poland:

Czekarzewice Drugie
Czekarzewice Pierwsze